{{Infobox football club
| clubname    = Ruch Chorzów
| image       = Ruch Chorzów - Herb (2021).svg
| upright = 0.8
| fullname    = Klub Sportowy Ruch Chorzów
| nickname    = Niebiescy (The Blues), Niebieska eRka (The Blue R), HKS (from Hajducki Klub Sportowy")
| founded     = 
| ground      = Ruch Stadium
| capacity    = 9,300 
| chairman    = Seweryn Siemianowski
| manager     = Jarosław Skrobacz
| league      = I liga
| season      = 2021–22
| position    = II liga, 3rd of 18 (promoted via play-offs)
| pattern_la1 = 
| pattern_b1  = _nikepark7gr
| pattern_ra1 = 
| pattern_sh1 =  
| pattern_so1 = 
| leftarm1    = 0000FF
| body1       = 0000FF
| rightarm1   = 0000FF
| shorts1     = FFFFFF
| socks1      = FFFFFF
| pattern_la2 = 
| pattern_b2  = _vitesse2122e
| pattern_ra2 = 
| pattern_sh2 = 
| pattern_so2 = 
| leftarm2    = FFFFFF
| body2       = FFFFFF
| rightarm2   = FFFFFF
| shorts2     = FFFFFF
| socks2      = FFFFFF
| pattern_la3 = 
| pattern_b3  = _nikepark7vb
| pattern_ra3 = 
| pattern_sh3 = 
| pattern_so3 = 
| leftarm3    = 77BBFF
| body3       = 77BBFF
| rightarm3   = 77BBFF
| shorts3     = 77BBFF
| socks3      = 77BBFF
| current     = 
| website     = https://www.ksruch.com/
}}
Ruch Chorzów is a Polish association football club based in Chorzów, Upper Silesia. It is one of the most successful football teams in Poland: fourteen-time national champions, and three-time winners of the Polish Cup. Currently the team plays in the Polish Second Division. Ruch plays at the Ruch Stadium with a capacity of 9,300 seats. The club is known for its Silesian identity. Ruch Chorzów has also had a very successful female handball team (9 times national champions).

History
The club was founded on 20 April 1920 in Bismarkhuta (German Bismarckhütte, historically Hajduki), one of the many heavily industrialised municipalities in the eastern part of Upper Silesia, a disputed province between Poland and Germany. The main incentive was an appeal of the Polish Plebiscite Committee a few months earlier that led to creation of around one hundred sport associations. It took place in between the first and second Silesian Uprisings, to which the name Ruch is a supposed cover reference. The Polish word ruch is however also a common noun for movement, not as strongly associated with Polishness as names of many other clubs established after the appeal (like Polonia, Powstaniec etc.). On the other hand, the club's first match, a 3:1 win against Orzeł Józefowiec, was played on 3 May 1920, the day of the first Polish Constitution. After the Upper Silesia plebiscite and the third Silesian Uprising in 1921 Bismarkhuta became part of Poland and the Silesian Voivodeship. The municipality was renamed to Wielkie Hajduki on 1 January 1923, hence the club was known as Ruch Wielkie Hajduki until another merger into the town Chorzów (created in 1934 from amalgamation of Królewska Huta, Chorzów and Hajduki Nowe) in the early 1939, with a short period in 1923 after the fusion with the older local German club Bismarckhütter Ballspiel Club, when it was known as Ruch BBC Wielkie Hajduki. After the merger the team played its games on the former BBC's pitch known as na Kalinie. The popular nickname of the club Niebiescy (The Blues) clung to the team already in the 1920s.

In autumn of 1920 Ruch won the promotion to the nascent Silesian Klasa A (see also: Lower Level Football Leagues in Interwar Poland). The Blues were third out of fourteen teams in its first season, unfinished due to the third Silesian Uprising. The next year Ruch won the championship of the Silesian Klasa A and represented the region in the 1922 Polish Football Championship. In 1924 the club finished second in the regional top league, behind AKS Królewska Huta, before 1924 considered German and known as Verein für Rasenspiele Königshütte, the first team Ruch had developed a local rivalry with. In 1925 the Silesian Klasa A did not play, instead Stanisław Flieger's Cup took place, ultimately won by Ruch, which gave the side a start in the only interwar Polish Cup competition in 1926. On 4 July 1926 Józef Sobota, before 1920 a BBC's player, became the first Ruch's player (and the fourth from Upper Silesia) of the Polish National Team, who also scored a goal (against Estonia). In the same year, two weeks after the national Cup Ruch won for the second time the regional Klasa A, firmly establishing itself as one of the strongest football clubs in this densely populated region and as such it was among the founding clubs of the Polish national league in 1927. In 1933 Ruch won its first Championship as the first side from Silesia, with all the players who were born not further as a few kilometers from the na Kalinie pitch. Thus the first truly golden era began. The local steel mill (since 1934 known as Huta Batory) began to financially support the side. In the winter of 1933 the most noteworthy players such as Edmund Giemsa, Teodor Peterek and Gerard Wodarz were joined by legendary Ernst Wilimowski, bought from 1. FC Kattowitz, who with Peterek and Wodarz were collectively nicknamed the three kings and helped to win another 4 championships (1934, 1935, 1936, 1938). On 1 November 1934 the club, as the last in the league, employed its first coach, Gustav Wieser. The side was also a leader in the unfinished season 1939. The successes rendered the club the most popular in the voivodeship and accelerated building of the new stadium in the years 1934-1935, the current Ruch Stadium.

After the German occupation of Poland in 1939, the club was officially discontinued but unofficially was simply renamed Bismarckhütter SV 99 and joined the Gauliga Oberschlesien in 1941. The club was officially re-established after the war. In 1947 Ruch won the regional championships. In 1948, under communist pressure (Stalinisation), the club was renamed Unia Chorzów, in 1955 it became Unia-Ruch, and finally in 1956 returned to the name Ruch. As Unia the club finished third in the first season of the reactivated national league in 1948 and in 1950 as the second team. In 1951 the club won the reactivated Polish Cup edition and were rewarded with the title of the National Champions (even though they were only sixth in the league). The next two years the club also won the title, first in 1952 after final against Polonia Bytom, another local bitter rival, and in 1953 after finishing the league on the top position. The most renowned player of that era was Gerard Cieślik, who dedicated his whole life to the club and became its icon.

The years 1957-1966 are considered a lost decade, completely overshadowed by the successes of the new biggest regional rival, Górnik Zabrze, even though the club won the championships in 1960. A record of its kind in the national football history as the team consisted of only 14 players, 11 of whom originated in the town of Chorzów. The turn of the tide came in the season 1967–68 when Ruch won the 10th championship title breaking Górnik Zabrze's streak of five consecutive titles. Another golden era for the Blues arrived in the early 1970s with Michal Vičan as a coach. In 1972–73 the club finished second, in 1973–73 they won the only double in the history (the championship and the cup) and advanced up to the quarter-finals of the UEFA Cup. In 1974–75 they again won the league and qualified to the quarter-finals of the European Cup. The most praised players of that times were Bronisław Bula, Zygmunt Maszczyk and Joachim Marx.

These successes were followed by a bad financial plight and mediocre results until 1978–79, when the club won its 13th Championship title. In the 1980s the club was one of the poorest in the national league. The worst came in the season 1986–87, when the club, the only one in the country which so far played all the seasons of the official national top league, was relegated to the second tier. Especially shifty were the circumstances of the relegation decider, against Lechia Gdańsk, when Ruch's goalkeeper Janusz Jojko scored an infamous and bizarre own goal and the club lost the game 1:2. After one year Ruch returned to the top flight as winners of the seconed league and won the 14th Championship title, as the second freshly-promoted club in the national history (the first was Cracovia in 1937), a feat, especially as it was still one of the poorest clubs in the top tier and over half of the players were home-grown, including e.g. Dariusz Gęsior and the most renowned Krzysztof Warzycha, who was also, with 24 goals, the top scorer of the season.

After the political turnover in Poland in 1989 Ruch did not fare well for the first two seasons. The money from the transfer of Krzysztof Warzycha to Panathinaikos A.O. finished quickly. The team began to compete with the top teams first in 1991–92 finishing in the fifth spot, fourth the next year, furthermore the second team (Ruch II) reached the Polish cup final. Ruch was demoted for the second time in the history in the season 1994–95. As before the stay in the second tier lasted one season. While playing in the second league Ruch won its third Polish Cup trophy. In 1998 Ruch reached the final of the UEFA Intertoto Cup and in the season 1999–2000 finished third in the league. The crisis came in 2002/2003 when the club was relegated from the top tier for the third time and in the next season was for the first time in history in danger of being demoted to the third tier, however the club won the relegation play-offs against Stal Rzeszów (1:1, 2:0). In 2005 the club was restructured as spółka akcyjna. The Blues won the promotion to the top flight in the season 2006/2007. In 2009 the side reached Polish Cup final, the next year The Blues finished third in the league. The best season in the recent history was 2011–12 when Ruch was vice-champion (only 1 point behind the champions, Śląsk Wrocław) and reached the final of the national cup (lost 0:3 against Legia Warsaw).

In 2017, it was decided that for the first time in the history of Polish football, in accordance with the Restructuring Law, SA will initiate an accelerated arrangement procedure aimed at agreeing the terms of debt repayment with creditors. These proceedings were opened before the Katowice District Court on 23 June 2017. In these proceedings all 255 creditors were offered to reduce the debt, spread it into installments or convert the debt into club shares. On 30 November 2017 creditors gathered in court to decide whether or not to accept the offer. The majority agreed and the agreement was adopted, ultimately the agreement became final on 13 March 2018. According to the provisions of the agreement, Ruch is to repay PLN 8 million złoty within 5 years. Installments are spread over 400 thousand złoty every quarter.

Ruch started the 2017–2018 season in Nice I liga with a 6 point deduction for unpaid debts. After a disastrous season in which the Blues suffered heavy defeats: 0:6 in a home match against Pogoń Siedlce (on the club's 98th anniversary); 1:6 in an away game against Miedź Legnica and a 0:6 in the away game against Wigry Suwałki, the club finished last in the league, being 11 points off the play-off place, which resulted in the first relegation to the third level in Ruch's history.

Ruch ended the 2018–2019 season in the II liga in last place, 8 points off of safety. It was the third season in a row in which the Blues were relegated from last place in the table.

In 2020–2021 Ruch dominated group III of the III liga and were promoted to the II liga, 11 points ahead of second placed Polonia Bytom.

Ruch finished the 2021–22 season in 3rd place which meant they qualified for the promotion play-offs. In the semi-finals the team had to face Radunia Stężyca, which they beat 1–0 with a goal from Daniel Szczepan in the 118th minute. The final was played in Chorzów, where Ruch faced 5th placed Motor Lublin, on 29 May Ruch won 4–0 and was promoted for the second season in a row, returning to the I liga for the first time since the 2017–18 season.

Achievements
Polish championship
Winners (14): 1933, 1934, 1935, 1936, 1938, 1951, 1952, 1953, 1960, 1968, 1974, 1975, 1979, 1989
Runners-up (6): 1950, 1956, 1963, 1970, 1973, 2012
Third place (9): 1937, 1948, 1954, 1955, 1967, 1983, 2000, 2010, 2014
Polish Cup:
Winners (3): 1951, 1974, 1996
Runners-up (6): 1963, 1968, 1970, 1993, 2009, 2012
Polish SuperCup:
Runners-up (2): 1989, 1996
European Cup
Quarter-finals (1): 1975
UEFA Cup
Quarter-finals (1): 1974
UEFA Intertoto Cup
Finalist (1): 1998
Youth teams:
Polish U-19 champions: 1965, 1984

Current squad

Out on loan

Managerial history

<div style="font-size:100%">

Ruch in Europe

Crest
Ruch Chorzów has a very specific crest and is one of the most recognizable football crests in Poland. There isn't information who was the author of the prototype and in which year the crest was used for the first time. The oldest confirmed source is letterhead from 1929. The club colours are blue and white. They accompany the team from the very beginning of the club's existence and already in the twenties it was written about Ruch - "Niebiescy" (en. The Blues). This color has become the symbol of the club. Except for the emblem of Unia Chorzów (around 1949-1955), the shield of the crest has always been, more or less precisely, the blue Reuleaux triangle with the club's full name on the rim. The white center of the sign is filled with an acronym. In the late 1980s, the monogram was decorated with thin lines, emphasizing the activity, militancy and mobility of the signet itself, and thereby reflecting the name of the club in a slightly expressive way (Ruch means Movement in english). In September 2007, it was decided to make a facelift of the logo, which was to be a sign of the continuous evolution of the brand of Ruch Chorzów. Shading was introduced to the sign in order to plasticize the drawing, give depth and spaciousness to the whole crest. In this way, they tried to show the spirit of nowadays and to gain the identity of a modern and attractive brand. However, trends for gradients quickly passed, while the crest in this version stayed for a long time and received many opponents. In 2021, after the jubilee year, starting its second century, the club decided to return to the most acceptable version of the crest among fans. Due to the lack of a consistent chronology of individual marks, the above listing of all crests with dates is approximate and conventional. Upper Silesian symbolism 

Ruch Chorzów proudly emphasizes its Silesian origin. It has been assumed that the club is called "synonymous of Silesianess" or "the most Silesian of Silesian clubs". On the stadium mast hangs the Upper Silesian flag, the speaker often shouts "Tooor!" (en. Goal!) into the microphone after the goals scored, and the club mascot is Adler, who speaks only in Silesian language, an anthropomorphic eagle, stylized as a golden eagle from the Upper Silesian coat of arms. In the fan stores there are many products with Upper Silesian symbols, in the social media the club tags all posts with the hashtag #MySomRuch (en. We are Ruch), and in the club television people often uses the Silesian language. An example may be the video promoting the match against Zagłębie Sosnowiec.
 
The symbolism of Upper Silesia is also often displayed from the sports side. On July 15, 2015, on the Silesian Flag Day, the club presented new away kits for the 2015/2016 season. The yellow jersey, blue shorts and yellow socks alluded to the flag of Upper Silesia, intended to emphasize the Silesian character of the Ruch, in whose traditions the club is so deeply rooted. The debut of the kits took place on the 80th anniversary of the stadium, and the team played in such a set for the first time in history. On that day, the coat of arms of the Silesian Voivodeship was additionally on the sleeve, and the speaker during the match was speaking entirely in Silesian language.
 
In the 2016/2017 season, the footballers jerseys had a large coat of arms of Upper Silesia with the inscription "Upper Silesia". Initially, only the first match was played in such kits, and all of them went to the charity auction, but after many requests from fans and the approval of the winners of these auctions, the emblem was printed on kits once again and from the 13th round they were played in such jerseys (blue and away white) until the end of the season.
 
On April 23, 2022, in a match against Radunia Stężyca, the captain of Ruch Chorzów, Tomasz Foszmańczyk, for the first time in the history of the club, put on a captain's armband with the Upper Silesian flag. Ruch accentuated in this way the genealogy of the team.

 Supporters and rivalries 

Ruch's popularity exploded in the 1930s and remained strong up to this date, especially in Upper Silesia. A specific subculture of szalikowcy (the name derived from szalik - scarf) developed in the 1970s, as elsewhere in the country, but in the region only after it first appeared among the fans of Polonia Bytom. There are also hooligans (Psycho Fans, formed in the mid 1990s) and ultras („Nucleo Ultra '03" from 2003, replaced by „Ultras Niebiescy", formed in 2008).

Expressions of Upper Silesian identity are often displayed with golden-blue flagues, on banners (like controversial "Oberschlesien", now banned, or „To my Naród Śląski" - It's us - Silesian Nation'') or in chants.

Ruch's supporters maintain friendships with fans of Widzew Łódź (since 2005), Elana Toruń, Atlético Madrid. The biggest animosity is held against followers Górnik Zabrze (The Great Silesian Derby), GKS Katowice, Polonia Bytom (the oldest Silesian derby), Zagłębie Sosnowiec, Legia Warszawa, Lech Poznań.

Notable individual supporters of Ruch are, among others:
 Jerzy Bralczyk – professor at Warsaw University
 Jerzy Buzek – professor of technical science and politician who was the ninth post-Cold War Prime Minister of Poland from 1997 to 2001
 Gustaw Holoubek – actor, director, member of the Polish Sejm, and a senator.
 Bogdan Kalus – actor
 Wojciech Kilar – classical and film music composer
 Wojciech Kuczok – novelist, poet, and screenwriter
 Kazimierz Kutz – film director, author, journalist and politician
 Jan Miodek – linguist, professor of Wrocław University
 Jerzy Szymik – poet, professor of KUL
 Ingmar Villqist (Jarosław Świerszcz) – writer

Notable former players

Notes

References

External links
 Official website 
 Fansite 
 Ruch Chorzów at 90minut.pl 

 
Association football clubs established in 1920
1920 establishments in Poland